is a Japanese footballer who plays as a right back for J2 League club Montedio Yamagata, on loan from Nagoya Grampus.

Career

Club
Naruse made his debut for Nagoya Grampus on 7 March 2018, against Urawa Red Diamonds in the J.League Cup, with his League debut coming on 18 March 2018, coming on as a 76th minute substitute for Jô in Nagoya Grampus' 1-0 defeat to Kawasaki Frontale.

Career statistics

Club
.

References

External links

Official Twitter profile

2001 births
Living people
Japanese footballers
Association football people from Aichi Prefecture
J1 League players
J2 League players
Nagoya Grampus players
Fagiano Okayama players
Montedio Yamagata players
Association football midfielders